Prostatic plexus may refer to:
 Prostatic plexus (nervous)
 Prostatic venous plexus